Bardiccio, also known as bardiccio fiorentino, or salsiccia matta is a typical Tuscan cold cut, similar to burischio,  whose preparation is based on the use of the less valuable and rich in blood parts of pork. Its typical dark red color depends on the quantity of heart - generally bovine - used in the mixture. Bardiccio has the characteristic shape of a sausage, but it is longer and is stuffed into a pork casing, tied with string. It is produced from September to May and is eaten unaged.

Bardiccio is part of the Presidia and Ark of Taste of Slow Food under the name bardiccio fiorentino and is included among the prodotti agroalimentari tradizionali italiani by the Region of Tuscany under the heading "Fresh meat (and offal) and their preparation". The original production area is limited to the municipalities of Valdisieve and, marginally, of Valdarno.

Historical references 
Originally bardiccio was invented as a dish of the so-called poor Tuscan tradition. In a logic of food recycling - typical of peasant families or however less affluent - all the less noble parts of the pig and of the ox, including the entrails, were recovered. Originally bardiccio, besides being unaged, was seasoned in order to be used during the year as a stuffing or as an ingredient to flavor vegetable soups.

Production 

The Regional Agency for Development and Innovation in the Agricultural-Forestry Sector (ARSIA) estimates an annual production of about 400-500 quintals of bardiccio, divided between butchers (30-60 kg per week) and delicatessens (80-100 kg per week).

There is no codified recipe for bardiccio, as every small producer mixes the various ingredients according to its own tradition.

It is made using mainly second and third grade pork, which is generally not used in the production of other cured meats such as finocchiona, sausage or salami: chopped tenderloin, fat, heart, lung, liver, spleen and other cuts not used in other processes because they are too small. To this is added, in lesser percentage and with the purpose of refining the taste, beef.

Meat is coarsely minced with a meat grinder and then salt, pepper, aromas and spices are added, the main one being wild fennel. Bardiccio is, to all intents and purposes, a fennel flavored sausage.

The mixture thus obtained is mixed with a kneading machine and packed in a pork casing of about 30 centimeters, tied at the ends with string. It is generally tied in rows of two or in rows of four.

Consumption 
Bardiccio is grilled or stewed. More rarely it is boiled. It is typically served with Tuscan bread and accompanied with Chianti Rufina or other robust Tuscan wines.

Manifestations 
Even though they are limited to the province of Florence, there are many enogastronomical manifestations connected to the bardiccio:

 Festa del bardiccio, Dicomano (December)
 Palio del bardiccio, Pelago (March)
 Sagra del bardiccio, Vicchio (O)
 Sagra del fusigno, Londa (24 December)
 Sagra del tortello e bardiccio, Rufina (fall-summer)
 Sagra della zucca gialla e del bardiccio, Pelago (October)
 Toscanello d'oro, Pontassieve (May-June)

References

Bibliography

In Italian

In English

Related articles 

 Salsiccia

External links 

 
Italian sausages
Fresh sausages
Products with protected designation of origin